The Association of the Most Beautiful Villages of Quebec is an association created in 1997 by Jean-Marie Girardville and inspired from similar associations in France, Belgium, and Italy. Its objective is to promote the preservation and the enhancement of the architectural and historical heritage of villages in Quebec, as well as the quality of their landscape. As of 2009, it had 37 village members located in 10 different regions.

List of village members 
 Cacouna
 Calixa-Lavallée
 Cap-Santé
 Champlain
 Côte-Nord-du-Golfe-du-Saint-Laurent
 Deschambault-Grondines
 Dudswell
 Frelighsburg
 Hudson
 Inverness
 Kamouraska
 Lac-Brome
 L'Anse-Saint-Jean
 Les Éboulements
 Les Îles-de-la-Madeleine 
 L'Islet
 Lotbinière
 Métis-sur-Mer
 Neuville
 Notre-Dame-du-Portage
 Percé
 Sainte-Pétronille
 Sainte-Rose-du-Nord
 Saint-Antoine-de-Tilly
 Saint-Antoine-sur-Richelieu
 Saint-Denis-sur-Richelieu
 Saint-Irénée
 Saint-Jean-de-l'Île-d'Orléans
 Saint-Laurent-de-l'Île-d'Orléans
 Saint-Michel-de-Bellechasse
 Saint-Pacôme
 Saint-Siméon
 Saint-Vallier
 Stanbridge East
 Stanstead
 Tadoussac
 Verchères

See also
 Les Plus Beaux Villages de France
 The most beautiful villages in Italy
 Les Plus Beaux Villages de Wallonie

External links
 Official site

Villages
Organizations based in Quebec
1997 establishments in Quebec
Organizations established in 1997
Lists of most beautiful villages